Leo Chiosso (b. Turin, 8 August 1920 – d. Chieri, Italy, 26 November 2006) was an Italian lyricist mostly known for his work with Fred Buscaglione. They formed a songwriting duo who produced about forty songs and created Buscaglione's public persona, a humorous tough guy with a penchant for whisky and women.

Chiosso and Buscaglione met in 1938 in the night-club scene of Turin, hometown to both of them. At that time, Chiosso was a university student, while Buscaglione eked out a living as a jazz singer and musician in those clubs.

Their friendship was abruptly interrupted by World War II. Chiosso was deported to Poland, while Buscaglione ended up in a US internment camp in Sardinia. Chiosso had news about his friend's fate thanks to the radio - Buscaglione had joined the allied radio station orchestra in Cagliari, and Chiosso knew he was still alive when he heard him playing.

Chiosso and Buscaglione reunited in Turin after the end of the war, and started writing songs together. Chiosso's lyrics were inspired by the American crime fiction he was an avid reader of, as well as by current news. They were humorous stories about gangsters and their babes, New York City and Chicago, tough men who were ruthless with enemies but easily fell victims to a woman's charms. They fitted perfectly with the image of amiable braggart Buscaglione was creating for himself.

The first Buscaglione-Chiosso hit was Che bambola of 1956, the song that brought Buscaglione to nationwide celebrity. It was followed by many other hits, including Che notte, Criminalmente bella, Il dritto di Chicago, Eri piccola così, Lontano da te, Love in Portofino, Porfirio Villarosa, Sgancia e pedala, Teresa non sparare, Whisky facile.

Their last work together was the movie Noi duri of 1960, featuring Buscaglione and the famous Italian actor Totò. Chiosso wrote both the story and the script for the movie, as well as the lyrics for two songs of the soundtrack, Noi duri and Ninna nanna del duro. The making of the movie was still in progress when Buscaglione died in a car crash.

Chiosso's career successfully continued. He penned lyrics for famous songs such as Parole, parole, parole,
Torpedo blu, and Montecarlo. He was also a prolific television author - among his TV credits, the extremely popular music show Canzonissima. He also wrote stories and scripts for cinema.

External links 
 

1920 births
2006 deaths
Writers from Turin
20th-century Italian screenwriters
Italian songwriters
Male songwriters
20th-century Italian musicians
Italian male screenwriters
20th-century Italian male musicians
20th-century Italian male writers
Italian rugby union players